Dessouki or Desouki is an Egyptian surname that may refer to
Salah Dessouki (1922–2011), Egyptian fencer
Yehia Dessouki (born 1978), Egyptian visual artist
Ad-Desouki (died 1815), Egyptian jurist 
Ibrahim El Desouki (1255–1296), a Sufi saint and Imam
Nagwa El Desouki (born 1971), Swiss slalom canoer